Shahrak-e Shahid Namju (also Romanized as Shahrak-e Shahīd Nāmjū) is a village in Isin Rural District, in the Central District of Bandar Abbas County, Hormozgan Province, Iran. At the 2006 census, its population was 1,438, in 473 families.

References 

Populated places in Bandar Abbas County